James G. Ellis was an American composer. This article is a list of his notable works.

Works

Selected popular works 
James G. Ellis, Ogden, Utah
 "Where the Rippling Ogden Flows", words & music by Ellis (©1909)

Ellis & Armitage, Chicago
 "Motorcycle Michael With Me", words & music by Ellis (©1912; L.E. Ellis)
 "When I Carved Your Name With Mine", words by Anne Campbell, music by Ellis (©1913)

Ellis & Co., Grand Opera House Building, Chicago
 "Motorcycle Michael With Me", words & music by Ellis (©1912; L.E. Ellis);  (view)
 "When I Carved Your Name With Mine", words by Anne Campbell, music by Ellis (©1913); 
 "You're All This World To Me", words by Ellis, music by Joseph W. Ryback (né Joseph William Rybak; born 1881) (©1913; Ellis & Fisher, Chicago); 
 "My Great Grand Daddy Fought in 1812", words & music by E.G. James (pseudonym of James G. Ellis) (©1914; ©1942 Los Angeles)
 "The Tale the Tear Drop Told", words & music by Ellis (©1914; ©1942 Los Angeles) †
 "That Ragtime Symphony", words & music by E.G. James (pseudonym of James G. Ellis) (©1914; ©1942, Los Angeles); 
 "Take Me Back to Paradise", words by Anne Campbell & Leonard A. Meyer, music by Ellis (©1914; ©1941 Los Angeles);  †
 "Just Because You've Been So Good To Me" ("That's Why I Love You"), words & music by Ellis (©1913); 

Henderson & Co., New Haven, Indiana
 "Firelight Fancies", words by Kathryn Marie Henderson, music by Ellis (©1914);  (view)
 "The Bride and the Rose Bud", words by Kathryn Marie Henderson, music by Ellis (©1915);  (view)

Ellis Music, Chicago
 "I Am Dreaming Of My Irish Rose", words by Ellis, music by Jozef W. Rybak (né Joseph William Rybak; born 1881), arr. by Burrel Van Buren (©1914; ©1942 Los Angeles);  (view) †
 "In The Mellow, Mellow Moonlight", words & music by Ellis (©1915); 

Tell Taylor, Chicago
 "When the Bonnie, Bonnie Heather Is Blooming: I'll Return Annie Laurie to You", words & music by Ellis (©1915);  (view)

Frank K. Root & Co., a Chicago publisher (né Frank Kimball Root; 1856–1932)
 "When the Bonnie, Bonnie Heather Is Blooming: I'll Return Annie Laurie to You", words & music by Ellis (©1915); 
 "Last Night in a Dream", words & music by James G Ellis (©1917); 

Craig-Ellis & Co., Roger A. Graham, manager
 "Tears-A Reverie", A Paraphrase of James G. Ellis' Beautiful Ballad "The Tale The Tear' Drop Told", words & music by May Olivette Hill (1888–1978) (©1915)
 "The Tale the Tear Drop Told", words & music by Ellis (©1914; ©1942 Los Angeles);  †

H.S. Talbot & Co. (Hiram S. Talbot; born 1871), Chicago. Music Printers & Eng's.
 "Funny Charlie Chaplin", words & music by Ellis (©1915); 

Acme Music Publishers, 12 East 35th Street, Chicago
 "Funny Charlie Chaplin", words & music by Ellis (©1915); 

Monarch Music Publishers, Chicago
 "My Little Geisha", words by Ellis, music by Adelene Ingram (©1916; ©1944 Los Angeles);  (audio)

Phenix Music Publishers, 145 N. Clark Street, Chicago
 "We'll Put Another Star in the Star Spangled Banner", words by Arthur J. Lamb, music by Ellis (©1916);  (view)

John G. Winter
 "Waltz Me in the Good Old Fashioned Way", words by John G. Winter, music by Ellis (©1915)

Miscellaneous
 "Love's Joys and Sorrows", words by Barbara Moser, music by Ellis (©1915 Barbara Moser, Berne, Indiana)
 The lyrics reflect Moser's dreams that a Chicago Police Detective, Captain Patrick D. O'Brien (1858–1935), will find her friend, Angelina E. Heller, who was lost in the SS Eastland Disaster.
 "Our Yesterdays", words by Tilla C. Cole, music by Ellis (©1915 Tilla C. Cole, Bazine, Kansas)
 Fortune, a musical play, text and music by Ellis (©1933, Los Angeles)

Morris H. Abell (1876–1931)
 "The Blue Star Turned to Silver, Then To Gold", words by Morris H. Abell, music by Ellis (©1918, ©1946 J. G. Ellis, Los Angeles); 

Thomas W. Hatch, Chicago
 "An Ocean Romance", words by Winnifred O'Hara, music by Ellis (©1919)

 † Billboard hit

Selected sacred works 
James G. Ellis (Jas. G. Ellis)
 "The Way To Paradise", words by Arthur J. Lamb, music by Ellis (©1917) 
 "Thine Is the Kingdom", poem by Joel B. Dow, music by Ellis (©1920); 
 "God's Perfect Child", words & music by Ellis (©1921, Chicago); 
 "Love, Thrill My Heart", words & music by Ellis (©1921); 

Thomas W. Hatch, Chicago
 "Leave It With Him", music by Ellis (©1917); 
 Words are an excerpt from the poem, "Yes, Leave It With Him", which is part of a longer poem titled "He Careth For You", by Rev. Edmund Bridges Miner (1829–1916), first published in the late 1870s in The Interior, a bygone periodical of Western Presbyterian Pub. Co.
 "Nearer" poem by Ellis, music by Margaret Birnbach (©1917); 
 "Beside a Summer Sea", words by Winnifred O'Hara, music by Ellis (©1919, ©1946 Los Angeles); 
 "I Shall Not Want" ("23rd Psalm"), music by Ellis (©1919); 
 "God Is Love", words by DeWitt McMurray (1866–1940), music by Ellis (©1920); 
 "Childlike", words by William P. McKenzie (1866–1942), music by Ellis (©1920)
 "Rejoice, My Son, Rejoice", words from psalms, music by Ellis (1920); 
 "Fear Not", words by Mrs. E. Perkins, music by Ellis (©1920); 
 "I Shall Not Want" ("23rd Psalm"), music by Ellis (©1920); 
 "In Quiet Resting Places", music by Ellis (©1921)

Golden Shore Pub. Co., Los Angeles
 "Transfiguration," music by Ellis (©1927; copyright assigned in 1939 to Boston Music Company) (audio)
 Words for the first 1/3rd of the song is Matthew's account of Jesus' transfiguration on the mountain
 Words for the remaining 2/3rds is an excerpt from Thomas Moore's Lalla Rookh

Boston Music Co. (G. Schirmer, Boston)
Henry Clough-Leighter, editor-in-chief since 1908 (1874–1956)
 "Leave It With Him", ibid (©1936; ©1945, Los Angeles); 
 "Leave It With Him", ibid, arranged by Chester Wallis (duet for high & low voice with piano or organ) (1936)
 Copyright December 28, 1936; Class E (musical composition), published, 59505, Boston Music Co.
 "As a Man Thinketh in His Heart" ("So Is He"), music by Ellis (©1935); 
 "I Shall Not Want" ("23rd Psalm"), music by Ellis (©1935); 
 "Rejoice, My Son, Rejoice", words from psalms, music by Ellis (1935);

Other published works 
 Even So To Them — The Law and the Prophets: In Twenty-Eight Chapters; Fiction That Should Be True, research by Mediratas (pseudonym of James Garfield Ellis), Wetzel Publishing Co., Los Angeles (©1943); 
  "Fictional restatement of the Way of Christ in its primitive purity, an interesting story couched in divine philosophy"

 Which Way, Pilgrim? research by Mediratas (pseudonym of James Garfield Ellis), Long Beach, California: Golden Rulers (publisher) (1950)
 The key to Christian Science and the Bible, research by Mediratas (pseudonym of James Garfield Ellis), annotations on writings from the first edition of Science and Health by Mary Baker Eddy (1875) and on related quotations from Bible
 By Ellis, Bell, California: Golden Rulers (publisher) (1951); 

 Golden Rulers, publisher, was owned by James Garfield Ellis
 Wetzel Publishing, Los Angeles, was a self publishing firm widely known for publishing Gadsby, a 50,000 word story written in 1939 without a single letter "e"

Selected discography 
 "Leave It With Him" (sacred music), words by Rev. Edmund Bridges Miner (1829–1916), music by Ellis (©1917); 
 Victor 45322; Matrix B-26470/6, sung by Elsie Baker, recorded May 18, 1922, Camden, New Jersey
 Library of Congress archive

 "Leave It With Him", ibid.; 
 Columbia Graphophone Co. 91515, Ambrose Jay Wyrick (1891–1960), tenor
 Personal Record, made for MackEllis Co.
 Selling Agent: Thomas W. Hatch, 208 N. Wabash Ave. Chicago

 "Leave It With Him" (sacred music), ibid.; 
 Edison Diamond Disc 56488-R
 Georgia Brevillier (née French; 1883–1950), contralto, with orchestra
 Recorded October 13, 1921

 "Love, Thrill My Heart" (sacred music); 
 Crown (label)
 Francois Anatole, with piano, viola, and flute

 Mary Dean Sings "Transfiguration"; 
 Mary Dean, vocalist; William Aubert Luce, organist
 Malibu, California: Sceptre Records

 Edison 5579, Edison 50403-R, & Edison Blue Amberol Records 3287 (©1917); ;
 Side R (cylinder): Matrix 5579-B-1-4[1-2] "When The Bonnie, Bonnie Heather is Blooming — I'll Return Annie Laurie To You", sung by Glen Ellison (1876–1947)
 Recorded in New York City, March 21, 1917

Selected works 
 Guide to Music Publishing (private ed.), Chicago

Notes

References 
Catalog of Copyright Entries, Part 3 Musical Compositions, New Series, Library of Congress, Copyright Office

''Catalog of Copyright Entries, Books'', Library of Congress, Copyright Office

Inline citations

External links 
 Sheet music to "Funny Charlie Chaplin"

Ellis, James G